Sabanas de San Ángel, Spanish for Savannas of Saint Angel, is a town and municipality of the Colombian Department of Magdalena. Founded around 1607 with the name San Antoñito by the Spanish Colonizers as a pathway town in the route between La Guajira Department and the Magdalena River. On June 24, 1999 the municipality is created with the name of Sabanas de San Angel that segregated from the municipalities of Ariguaní, Pivijay, Chibolo and Plato.

Politics

Administrative divisions

Corregimientos and caseríos:
Monterrubio
Casa de Tabla
La Horqueta
Flores de Maria
Pueblo de los Barrios
San Roque
Céspedes
Pueblo Nuevo
Estación Villa.

References

External links
 Sabanas de San Angel official website
 Gobernacion del Magdalena - municipios: Sabanas de San Angel

Municipalities of Magdalena Department